Huang Shao-ku (24 July 1901 – 16 October 1996) was a Taiwanese politician. He was the Vice Premier from 1954 to 1958 and 1966 to 1969.

Education
Huang graduated from Peiping Normal University in Peking.

References

Taiwanese Ministers of Foreign Affairs
1901 births
1996 deaths
Beijing Normal University alumni
Republic of China politicians from Hunan
People from Nan County
Politicians from Yiyang
Taiwanese people from Hunan
Ambassadors of the Republic of China
Taiwanese Presidents of the Judicial Yuan
Members of the 1st Legislative Yuan